KNCO (830 kHz) is a commercial AM radio station in Grass Valley, California.  It is owned by Nevada County Broadcasters and airs a news/talk radio format.  The studios and offices for KNCO and KNCO-FM are on East Main Street in Grass Valley.  The station streams its programming on the iHeartRadio platform and app.

KNCO is a Class B radio station operating with 5,000 watts.  AM 830 is a United States clear-channel frequency.  So KNCO must use a directional antenna during nighttime hours to prevent interference with the skywave signal of WCCO in Minneapolis, Minnesota, the Class A station on the frequency.  The transmitter is off Greenhorn Road in Grass Valley.

Programming
Weekdays on KNCO begin with a three-hour news and interview show, followed by local talk including a tradio-style buy and sell program.  At noon, nationally syndicated shows begin, including Markley, Van Camp and Robbins, The Clark Howard Show, The Lars Larson Show, Coast to Coast AM with George Noory and America in the Morning.

Weekends feature shows on gardening, home repair, religion, real estate and technology.  Weekend hosts include Kim Komando, Bill Cunningham, Jim Bohannon and Somewhere in Time with Art Bell.  KNCO carries Nevada Union High School football and basketball, and also broadcasts San Francisco 49ers games.

History
KNCO signed on the air on October 1, 1978.  It broadcast a mix of middle of the road music with news, talk and sports shows.  In September 1982, it added an FM station.  KNCO-FM was programmed with a separate adult contemporary music format.

KNCO was originally on 1250 kHz and was a 500 watt daytimer, required to be off the air from sunset to sunrise.  But by the 1980s, the Federal Communications Commission was relaxing rules for clear channel frequencies.  That gave KNCO the opportunity to move to the frequency of a clear channel station that would not have been permitted in earlier years.

In 1986, KNCO relocated to 830 kHz, increasing its power to 5,000 watts and was allowed to broadcast at night using a directional antenna.  In the 1990s, it eliminated music from its programming, switching to an all-talk format with news and sports.

References

External links
FCC History Cards for KNCO 
KNCO official website

NCO
News and talk radio stations in the United States
Grass Valley, California
Radio stations established in 1978